Fabián Andrés Maidana (born 22 June 1992) is an Argentine professional boxer. As an amateur, he won a silver medal at the 2010 Youth World Championships and a bronze at the 2010 Summer Youth Olympics.

He is the younger brother of former two-division world champion Marcos Maidana.

Early years
Maidana was born on 22 June 1992 in Margarita, Santa Fe, and from a young age aimed to follow in his brother's footsteps as a boxer. He began training at his cousin's gym when he was 14.

Competing as a light welterweight throughout his amateur career, Maidana enjoyed his most successful year in 2010 and he was named amateur boxer of the year by the Argentina Boxing Federation for his accomplishments. In February he won a bronze medal at the Panamerican Youth Championships. He suffered a quick exit at the South American Games the following month, but followed that up with a silver medal performance at the Youth World Championships in Azerbaijan, where he won five straight bouts before losing to Oleg Neklyudov of Ukraine in the final. Finally, he took home a bronze medal at the 2010 Summer Youth Olympics in Singapore during the summer.

In 2011, Maidana qualified for the Pan American Games through its qualification tournament process. In the first tournament held in Venezuela, he was quickly eliminated by Valentino Knowles in his very first match. However, he won a gold medal at the second tournament a month later to qualify. At the Games in Guadalajara, Maidana was eliminated by eventual silver medalist Valentino Knowles in his first bout. After three rounds the fight finished as a draw, but the win was given to Knowles on a tie-breaker because he landed more punches.

Amateur results

2010 Panamerican Youth Championships in Santiago, Dominican Republic (light welterweight)
 Defeated Raúl Sánchez (Dominican Republic) 5–4
 Lost to Prichard Colón (Puerto Rico) 4–10 
2010 South American Games in Medellín, Colombia (light welterweight)
 Lost to Myke Carvalho (Brazil) 0–8
2010 Youth World Championships in Baku, Azerbaijan (light welterweight)
 Defeated Victor Kuwornu (Ghana) 9–0
 Defeated Tamerlan Abdullayev (Azerbaijan) 7–4
 Defeated Rustam Adzinayev (Belarus) 6–5
 Defeated Zurab Mekerishvili (Georgia) 4–0
 Defeated Ričardas Kuncaitis (Lithuania) 3–0
 Lost to Oleg Neklyudov (Ukraine) 2–6 

2010 Summer Youth Olympics in Singapore (light welterweight)
 Defeated Muhammad Oryakhil (Afghanistan) 13–2
 Lost to Samuel Zapata (Venezuela) 2–4
 Defeated Oleg Neklyudov (Ukraine) WO 
2011 Pan American Games Qualifier 1 in Cumaná, Venezuela (light welterweight)
 Lost to Valentino Knowles (Bahamas) 7–12
2011 Pan American Games Qualifier 2 in Quito, Ecuador (light welterweight)
 Defeated Joelvis Hernández (Venezuela) 10–2
 Defeated César Rivas (Panamá) 24–7
 Defeated Anderson Rojas (Ecuador) 26–16
 Defeated Antonio Ortiz (Puerto Rico) 20–13 
2011 Pan American Games in Guadalajara, Mexico (light welterweight)
 Lost to Valentino Knowles (Bahamas) 17–17+

Professional career
Maidana moved to Oxnard, California to train with Robert Garcia, Marcos' former trainer, on the advice of Sebastián Contursi, Marcos' former manager. Maidana made his professional debut on 21 June 2014, defeating Eddie Diaz by unanimous decision on the undercard of the Vasyl Lomachenko–Gary Russell Jr. title fight at the StubHub Center. In his next two fights, he scored a first-round knockout against Philip Soriano on the Shawn Porter–Kell Brook card and a first-round technical knockout against Jared Teer on the Mayweather–Maidana II card. After eight straight wins in the United States, Maidana competed in Argentina for the first time, defeating Andrés Amarilla by unanimous decision in Necochea on 9 April 2016. He moved to 10–0 with a victory over Puerto Rican prospect Jorge Maysonet Jr., who failed to answer the bell for the seventh round.

On 26 November 2016, in just his second fight on home soil, Maidana captured the WBA Fedebol super welterweight title with a second-round TKO of Cristian Romero. After two more wins he faced former world champion Johan Pérez in Medellín, scoring a unanimous decision victory after 10 rounds. In 2018 he secured stoppage wins against Justin Savi at Barclays Center and Andrey Klimov at Staples Center. Ryan Songalia of The Ring wrote that, although he didn't possess the punching power of his older brother, he had "quicker hands and snappier combinations." His 16-fight win streak came to an end on 12 January 2019, when he lost a unanimous decision to Venezuelan veteran Jaider Parra. After a quick knockout of Mexican journeyman Ramsés Agatón that September, he was sidelined for the entire 2020 calendar year due to the COVID-19 pandemic.

Maidana made his return to the ring on 9 April 2021 in Buenos Aires, defeating Carlos Córdoba by unanimous decision.

Professional boxing record

References

External links
 

Living people
1992 births
Argentine male boxers
Light-middleweight boxers
People from Vera Department
Competitors at the 2010 South American Games
Boxers at the 2010 Summer Youth Olympics
Boxers at the 2011 Pan American Games
Pan American Games competitors for Argentina
Sportspeople from Santa Fe Province